FC KEK (FC KEK) is a football club based in Obilić, Kosovo. It was founded in 1928 and for most of the time played in the second tier, the First Football League of Kosovo, having reached promotion to Kosovo highest level in 2018.FC KEK won the Kosovar Cup and the Kosovar Super Cup in 2003. The club was known as Obilić, RMHK Kosovo and Elektroprivreda when playing in the Yugoslav football league system.

Notes and references

Notes:

References:

External links 

 
Football clubs in Kosovo
Association football clubs established in 1928
Obilić